The  New York Giants season was the franchise's 37th season in the National Football League.  After relinquishing the NFL East title the previous season, the Giants reclaimed the title with a 10–3–1 record, a half-game ahead of the defending champion Philadelphia Eagles.

New York traveled to Wisconsin for the NFL Championship Game and were shut out 37–0 by the Vince Lombardi-coached Green Bay Packers.

Roster

Regular season

Schedule

Game summaries

Week 2

Standings

Playoffs

See also
List of New York Giants seasons

References

External links
 New York Giants on Pro Football Reference
 Giants on jt-sw.com

New York Giants seasons
New York Giants
1961 in sports in New York City
1960s in the Bronx